Each member of this infinite family of uniform polyhedron compounds is a symmetric arrangement of antiprisms sharing a common axis of rotational symmetry. It arises from superimposing two copies of the corresponding prismatic compound of antiprisms (without rotational freedom), and rotating each copy by an equal and opposite angle.

This infinite family can be enumerated as follows:
For each positive integer n>0 and for each rational number p/q>3/2 (expressed with p and q coprime), there occurs the compound of 2n p/q-gonal antiprisms (with rotational freedom), with symmetry group:
Dnpd if nq is odd
Dnph if nq is even

Where p/q=2 the component is a tetrahedron, sometimes not considered a true antiprism.

References 
.

Polyhedral compounds